is a Japanese derogatory term for young Okinawan women who date male members of the United States Forces Japan stationed in Okinawa Prefecture. The other component of the term  (女 jo) means "female" or "girl".

There are scholars who note that amejo means someone who has an affinity for America and that the derogatory connotation was a result of a misunderstanding of the Okinawan language.

In her book Asian Mystique, author Sheridan Prasso explained the amejo in terms of the fetishizing that goes on between non-Asian males and Asian females:

Prasso explains the kokujo:

For Americans stationed in Okinawa, the term amejo came to mean American groupie or a "night owl". An account described how the term amejo was embraced by some who were given the pejorative, reappropriating the label as a source of pride, resistance, and social distinction as well as a demonstration of courage to be different.

See also
 Asian fetish
 Pinkerton Syndrome
 Sarong party girl
 Yellow cab (stereotype)

References

Race in Japan
Japanese sex terms
Dating
Intercultural and interracial relationships